Jeff Olson is a former American football coach.  He served as the head football coach at Southern Oregon University in Ashland, Oregon for nine seasons, from 1996 until 2004, compiling record of 50–36.

His son Dante Olson signed with the Philadelphia Eagles in 2020 after a collegiate career at Montana.

Head coaching record

References

Year of birth missing (living people)
Living people
Southern Oregon Raiders football coaches